Solomon Joel Anthony Shields (born 14 October 1989 in Leyton) is a football midfielder, who plays for St Albans City in the Southern League.

Career 
Shields made his debut for Orient on 5 May 2007 in the Football League One clash with Huddersfield Town which ended in a 3–1 defeat for Orient. On 3 February 2009, he joined St Albans City on loan for two months, having not made a first team appearance for Orient so far in the 2008–09 season, and was released by Orient on 4 May 2009.

During the summer of 2009 Shields spent two weeks on trial at Hayes & Yeading in an unsuccessful attempt to join the Conference Premier club, before re-signing with St Albans, this time on a permanent basis. After a successful start with his new club, Shields suffered an achilles tendon injury in late February 2010 whilst playing with friends, and spent months out of action.

In October 2010, Shields signed for Waltham Forest on a short-term deal.

Soon after he again joined St. Albans City, implementing himself into their new look side as starter in central midfield, partnering David Ijaha. Shields returned to first-team action with the saints in November 2010.

External links 

St Albans City F.C. past players - Solomon Shields

References

1989 births
Living people
Footballers from Leyton
English footballers
Association football midfielders
Leyton Orient F.C. players
St Albans City F.C. players
English Football League players
Waltham Forest F.C. players